Caladenia rileyi, commonly known as the Gillenbah spider orchid, is a plant in the orchid family Orchidaceae and is endemic to New South Wales. It is a ground orchid with a single leaf and a single yellowish-green and red flower.

Description
Flowering occurs from September to October.

Taxonomy and naming
Caladenia rileyi  was first formally described in 1997 by David Jones and the description was published in The Orchadian from a specimen collected in the Gillenbah State Forest near Narrandera.

Distribution and habitat
The Gillenbah spider orchid grows in Callitris woodland between Narrandera and Jerilderie on the south-west slopes of New South Wales.

References

rileyi
Plants described in 1997
Endemic orchids of Australia
Orchids of New South Wales
Taxa named by David L. Jones (botanist)